Prince Aleksandr Ivanovich Baryatinsky (tr. ;  – 9 March 1879) was a Russian General and Field Marshal (from 1859), Prince, governor of the Caucasus.

Early life and background 
He was born to aristocratic Baryatinsky family on 14 May 1815 in Ivanovsky village of Lgovsky district in Kursk Governorate. His father, Prince Ivan Ivanovich Baryatinsky  (1767-1825), was one of the wealthiest people in Russia, having inherited numerous estates and about 35,000 serfs. His mother was a Bavarian countess Maria Fyodorovna, née von Keller (1792-1858), daughter of Count Christoph von Keller and niece of the Russian field marshal Peter Wittgenstein.

Education and career 
He was the eldest son and received an excellent education at home. His father died in 1825, when Alexander was merely 10 years old. His mother took him along with his second son Vladimir to Moscow for "improvement in the sciences" in 1829. The upbringing of both brothers was carried out by an Englishman - Thomas Evans, a well-known teacher at that time, who taught young men "classics and literature."

Baryatinsky entered the school of the ensigns of the Guard in his seventeenth year and, on 8 November 1833, received his commission of cornet in the Life Guards of the future Tsar Alexander II. In 1835, he served with great gallantry in the Caucasus, and on his return to St.Petersburg was rewarded with a golden sword for valour. On 1 January 1836, he was attached to the suite of Alexander, and in 1845 was again ordered off to the Caucasus and again most brilliantly distinguished himself, especially in the attack on Shamil's stronghold, for which he received the Order of St. George. In 1846, he assisted Field Marshal Ivan Paskevich to suppress the Kraków Uprising. From 1848 to 1856 he took a leading part in all the chief military events in the Caucasus, his most notable exploits being his victory at Mezeninsk in 1850 and his operations against Shamil in Chechnya.

His energetic and at the same time systematic tactics inaugurated a new era of mountain warfare. On 6 January 1853, he was appointed adjutant general and, on 5 July of the same year, chief of staff. In 1854, he took part in the brilliant Kurbsk Dere campaign. On 1 January 1856, he became commander-in-chief of the Caucasian army, and, subsequently, viceroy of the Caucasus. As an administrator, he showed himself fully worthy of his high reputation. Within three years of his appointment, the whole of the eastern Caucasus was subdued and the long elusive Shamil was taken captive. Baryatinsky also conquered many of the tribes of the western Caucasus dwelling between the rivers of Laba and Belaya.

Final years and death 
By the early 1860s, his health had seriously deteriorated, and on 6 December 1862, he was relieved of his post at his own request. It was argued that "continuous combat activities and labors to govern the region completely upset health and ended a brilliant career." In fact, the reason for the dismissal was a loud scandal caused by the field marshal's connection with Elizaveta Davydova (1833-1899), granddaughter of Vakhtang Orbeliani, who was still married to Colonel Vladimir Davydov (son of Alexander Lvovich Davydov) at the time. After an "almost comic" duel, Davydova's divorce proceedings and his own resignation, the field marshal was finally able to officially formalize the marriage with her. After his marriage, Prince Baryatinsky lived abroad for a long time. He criticized the military reforms carried out by Dmitry Milyutin (formerly his chief of staff in the Caucasus). The mouthpiece of the conservative circles Rostislav Fadeev, was a protégé of Baryatinsky. By publishing a detailed account of the history of the Caucasian War, Fadeev hoped to draw public attention to the person of the retired field marshal in order to prepare his return to the political scene.

Subsequently, Baryatinsky made several attempts to return to the service, but he was tactfully denied this. In 1871 he was enlisted in Imperial cuirassier regiment and was appointed chief of the 2nd rifle battalion. The German emperor also honored Baryatinsky's merits by appointing him chief of the 14th hussar regiment of the German army. At the beginning of the Russo-Turkish war, it was expected that the emperor would appoint Baryatinsky as commander-in-chief, but the sovereign entrusted this post to his brother.

He spent the last days of his life abroad and died of heart disease in Geneva, after forty-eight years of active service.

Political views 
In the 1860s, Baryatinsky's views shifted towards Slavophilism, more precisely, Pan-Slavism. When, in 1866, Prussia unleashed a war in the center of Europe, Baryatinsky offered the Russian government an alliance with Prussia in order to divide the Austrian Empire: the Slavic lands were to go to Russia, the German lands to Prussia, and Hungary to become independent. But a special secret committee under the emperor rejected this plan. He saw halting of British advance in Asia as a matter of urgency. He is also remembered for overseeing and advocating for the genocide of Circassians.

Awards

Domestic awards 

 Gold weapon for Bravery (1836)
 Order of St. George, 4th degree (July 7 (19), 1845)
 Order of St. Vladimir 4th degree with a bow (1848)
 Order of St. Anna 1st degree (1851)
 Order of St. George 3rd degree (August 9 (21), 1854)
 Order of the White Eagle (1856)
 Order of St. Alexander Nevsky (1857)
 Order of St. Vladimir 1st class with swords (1859)
 Order of St. George, 2nd degree (08/10/1859)
 Order of the Holy Apostle Andrew the First-Called with swords over the order (8 (20) September 1859)
 Diamond signs to the order of the Holy Apostle Andrew the First-Called with swords over the order (December 6 (18), 1862)
 Gold sword decorated with diamonds with the inscription "In memory of the conquest of the Caucasus" (1864)

Foreign awards 
  Kingdom of Prussia:
 Knight of the Order of the Red Eagle, 3rd Class, 1838
 Knight of Honour of the Order of Saint John of Jerusalem, 20 July 1840
 Knight of the Order of the Black Eagle, 10 February 1863
 
 Order of Leopold 3rd degree (1839)
 Royal Hungarian Order of St. Stephen Grand Cross (1874)
 
 Order of the Crown 3rd degree (1839)
 
 Order of the Zähringer Lion, 3rd degree (1839)
 House Order of Fidelity (1861)
 
 Order of Civil Merit (1840)
 
 Order of the White Falcon 3rd degree (1840)
 
 Order of Ludwig 1st degree (1843)
 
 Order of the Oak Crown, 2nd degree (1844)
 Military Order of William, Grand Cross (1860)
 
 Order of the Lion and the Sun 1st degree (1852)
 
 Legion of Honour, Grand Cross (1875)

See also
Alexander Vladimirovich Baryatinsky
Yury Baryatinsky
Leonilla Bariatinskaya

Literature 
 Alfred J. Rieber (Editor): The Politics of Autocracy. Letters of Alexander II to Prince A. I. Bariatinskii 1857 - 1864, Mouton & Co, Paris/The Hague 1966

References

 Endnotes:
A. L. Zisserman, Fieldmarshal Prince A. I. Baryatinski (Russ.) (Moscow, 1888–1891).

1815 births
1879 deaths
Circassian genocide perpetrators
Field marshals of Russia
Knights Grand Cross of the Military Order of William
Members of the State Council (Russian Empire)
People of the Caucasian War
Recipients of the Order of St. George of the Second Degree
Recipients of the Order of St. George of the Third Degree
Rurikids
Russian military personnel of the Caucasian War
Grand Crosses of the Order of Saint Stephen of Hungary